James Gilbey is a former British actor. He is possibly best known for playing the character Jack Woodman in the BBC soap opera EastEnders during the early 1990s. Gilbey has since given up performing to work "behind the camera" and worked as creative director for Discovery Networks Europe before becoming Vice President and Group Creative Director of the Discovery Agency by 2014.

Career
Gilbey has a BA (Hons) in English and Art History from Loughborough University. He began his career as an actor during the 1980s, appearing in Play for Today (1980), An Unsuitable Job for a Woman (1982) and Bad Boyes (1988).

In 1992 he was cast as Jack Woodman in BBC's EastEnders—a student who had a fling with the long running character, Michelle Fowler (Susan Tully), and then stalked her. Gilbey's character remained on-screen til April 1993. Following this, Gilbey was involved in the award-winning consumer programme for children's BBC, called Short Change. He worked on the series between 1994 and 1998.

Gilbey went on to work for various international broadcasters including Walt Disney International and Nickelodeon "in a variety of creative production and on-air roles". Gilbey retired from performing, but has remained in the television industry, working "behind the scenes". Gilbey was the creative director for Discovery Networks Europe. His remit included directing and overseeing promotion on Discovery Channel's European, Middle Eastern, and African (EMEA) networks. By 2014, Gilbey had become Vice President and Group Creative Director of the Discovery Agency.

References

External links

English male soap opera actors
Living people
Alumni of Loughborough University
Year of birth missing (living people)